The 1913 Haskell Indians football team was an American football team that represented the Haskell Indian Institute  (now known as Haskell Indian Nations University) as an independent during the 1913 college football season. In its third season under head coach A. R. Kennedy, Haskell compiled a 10–1 record and outscored opponents by a total of 419 to 31. The team's victories included games against Texas A&M and Christian Brothers; the sole loss was to Nebraska.

Schedule

References

Haskell
Haskell Indian Nations Fighting Indians football seasons
Haskell Indians football